What Are You So Scared Of? is the debut studio album by Australian rock band Tonight Alive, released on 14 October 2011 through Sony Music Australia. The standard CD version of What Are You So Scared Of? contains 10 pre-gap hidden acoustic takes of the album. Let It Land EP was released to accompany it; it shares the track "Let It Land", and also contains a new song and the three acoustic versions which were unable to fit on the album. Tonight Alive traveled to Los Angeles to record the album with producer Mark Trombino (Blink-182, Jimmy Eat World, Midtown). As the follow-up to 2010's Consider This EP, What Are You So Scared Of? debuted on the Australian albums chart at No. 15.

Production
What Are You So Scared Of? was recorded at NRG Studios in Hollywood, California, and Music Friends Studios, in Los Angeles, California, in January 2011. Mark Trombino produced and engineered the sessions with assistant engineer Josh Newell. Mark Maxwell did additional production on "Starlight" and "Let It Land", while Mike Green did the same for "Sure as Hell". Tombino mixed the recordings, and then they were mastered by John Davis at Metropolis in London.

Release
The record's first single, "Starlight", was released 1 July. Its second, "Let It Land", was released 19 September. On 11 October, "Thank You and Goodnight" was made available for streaming. On 4 November the group announced they had signed a North American deal with independent label Fearless Records and were planning on releasing their album in that territory in early 2012. In November and December, the group supported Blessthefall on the Fearless Friends Tour in the US. What Are You So Scared Of? was released in the US on 14 February 2012. Deluxe edition included three tracks: "You Know Me", "Welcome" and "Take Me Down". Upon its US release, it debuted at No. 7 on the US Heatseekers Albums chart, No. 48 on US Rock Albums and No. 10 on Independent Albums. While the group was planning to support Go Radio on their headlining spring tour in the US, they had to drop of due to McDougall having an eczema outbreak. On 12 October a music video was released for "Listening". A behind-the-scenes video was also released. In October and November, the band supported Pierce the Veil on their Collide with the Sky Tour in the US.

Track listing
All tracks written by Tonight Alive, except where noted.

The Australian iTunes edition contains the bonus track "Welcome", three music videos and two behind-the-scenes videos.

Let It Land
The Let It Land EP is the accompanying disc to What Are You So Scared Of?, available on CD. What Are You So Scared Of? features 10 pre-gap hidden acoustic tracks in addition to the 14-track album; the additional acoustic tracks that were unable to fit on the album make up the majority of Let It Land. Also included on the EP is a new song, "Welcome".

"Let It Land"
"Welcome"
"Fake It" (acoustic)
"Listening" (acoustic)
"Reason to Sing" (acoustic)

Personnel
Personnel per booklet.

Tonight Alive
 Jenna McDougall – lead vocals
 Whakaio Taahi – guitar, backing vocals
 Jake Hardy – guitar
 Cam Adler – bass guitar, backing vocals
 Matty Best – drums

Production and design
 Mark Trombino – producer, engineer, mixing
 Josh Newell – assistant engineer
 John Lavis – mastering
 Mark Maxwell – additional production (tracks 3 and 5)
 Mike Green – additional production (track 4)
 Josh Mann – graphic design, layout
 John Engelhardt – cover illustration
 Elliot Toms – band pic

Charts

References

External links

What Are You So Scared Of? at YouTube (streamed copy where licensed)

2011 albums
Emo pop albums
Fearless Records albums
Tonight Alive albums